Back to the Street is the eighth studio album of the Christian rock band, Petra. It was released in 1986 and is the first album to be produced by John and Dino Elefante.

The album is also the first to feature new lead singer John Schlitt, former lead singer of Head East, and the last to feature a guitar-shaped space ship on its cover.

While the sound of the album is rather transitional and unlike anything that would be heard by the group for another seven years, it did mark a movement toward the style that would become Petra's most identifiable sound: prominent keyboards backing up hard-edged guitar tones and raspy, near-screaming vocals.

Track listing
All songs written by Bob Hartman, except where noted.
 "Back to the Street" – 4:14
 "You Are I Am" – 3:08
 "Shakin the House" (words by Hartman and John Lawry) – 4:28
 "King's Ransom" – 4:18
 "Whole World" – 4:50
 "Another Crossroad" – 3:50
 "Run for Cover" – 3:15
 "Fool's Gold" – 4:48
 "Altar Ego" – 4:43
 "Thankful Heart" (words by Hartman and Dino Elefante) – 3:17

Awards
 Nominated for Grammy Award for Best Gospel Performance in 1986.

Personnel 
Petra
 Bob Hartman – guitars, arrangements 
 John Schlitt – lead vocals, backing vocals 
 John Lawry – keyboards, Fairlight programming, background vocals
 Mark Kelly – bass guitar, background vocals
 Louie Weaver – drums

Additional personnel
 John Elefante – keyboards, backing vocals, arrangements
 Dino Elefante – arrangements

Production
 John Elefante – producer, engineer, mixing at Pakaderm Studio, Long Beach, California
 Dino Elefante – producer, engineer, mixing
 Mike Mireau – engineer
 Dave Rogers – art direction, cover design, concept
 Randy Rogers – art direction, cover design, concept, illustration 
 Bill Brunt – art direction, photography 
 Scott Bonner – photography 
 Ron Keith – photography

References 

1986 albums
Petra (band) albums